In a spherical coordinate system, a colatitude is the complementary angle of a given latitude, i.e. the difference between a right angle and the latitude. Here Southern latitudes are defined to be negative, and as a result the colatitude is a non-negative quantity, ranging from zero at the North pole to 180° at the South pole.

The colatitude corresponds to the conventional 3D polar angle in spherical coordinates, as opposed to the latitude as used in cartography.

Examples
Latitude and colatitude sum up to 90°.

Astronomical use

The colatitude is most 
useful in astronomy because it refers to the zenith distance of the celestial poles.

Adding the declination of a star to the observer's colatitude gives the maximum latitude of that star (its angle from the horizon at culmination or upper transit).

Stars whose declinations exceed the observer's colatitude are called circumpolar because they will never set as seen from that latitude. If an object's declination is further south on the celestial sphere than the value of the colatitude, then it will never be seen from that location. Additionally, colatitude is used as part of the Schwarzschild metric in general relativity.

References

Spherical geometry
Orientation (geometry)